The tlaximaltepoztli (tlāximaltepoztli; in Nahuatl, tlaximal=carpentry and tepoztli=metal axe) or simply tepoztli was a common weapon used by civilizations from Mesoamerica which was formed by a wooden haft in which the poll of the bronze head was inlaid in a hole in the haft. It was used for war or as a tool. Its use is documented by the Codex Mendoza and the Codex Fejérváry-Mayer. Tax collectors from the Aztec Empire demanded this kind of axe as tribute from the subjugated kingdoms. In Aztec mythology, the tepoztli was used by the god Tepoztécatl, god of fermentation and fertility. In Codex Borgia he is represented with a bronze axe.

Description

The tepoztli, was a weapon used by some kingdoms in Mesoamerica, this weapon was used during the Spanish conquest of the Aztec Empire in the XVI. It was famously used by the Purépecha Empire from which many original pieces have been discovered. According to the size of the bronze axe heads exhibited by the National Anthropology Museum and also to the images of the Codex Fejérváry-Mayer, the tepoztli was estimated to be 1 foot 3 inches to 3 foot long, and 1 inch and a half wide, it had a hole in the shaft where the head of the axe head was inserted and strongly attached with a natural adhesive based in pine tree sap and coal.

A decorative version of the tepoztli were the axe-monies which were highly prized in the late post-classic. However these objects were not war effective due to their small thickness and also because of their brittle or soft mechanical properties.

This weapon was also used as a tool for the manufacture of wooden objects and it was a regular house hold in the Aztec homes. The axe was part of the marriage dowry between commoners in Tenochtitlan, where it was presented to the wife along with other house hold items

Metallurgics
Mesoamerican axes were mostly made of bronze in the Post-classic period, with high Vickers Hardness values (VHN) ranging from 130 to 297 VHN in the bronze alloys. Only the old and more primitive Pre-classic copper axes the VHN value ranged from 80-135

Metallurgics were introduced in West Mexico via maritime trade during the Classic period, since most found objects are near the coast during this period. This technology seems to have been imported due to the League of Merchants that traded articles from as far south as Ecuador to the coast of Culiacán, Mexico. Ecuadorian and west Mexican objects show that not only were the artifacts were found in analogous archeological context, but they share identical chemical composition and manufacturing techniques, and their designs are very similar.

The grain size of the metallic alloy is variable along the body, showing intensive cold work by hammering in the edges. This cold work treatment increased the hardness of the axe in this important area, while leaving the rest of the structure more soft so it could resist the impacts of daily use.

Historical References
During the invasion of West Mexico, it was reported that locals built boats for Hernán Cortés with the help of axes. Also in the Lienzo de Jucutacato it is represented the migration of a metallurgical guild from the Golf coast to Uruapan.

Origin and distribution
The tlaximaltepoztli was widely used in many regions of Mesoamerica since many different cultures were very specialized in metallurgics, they also used bronze for making tools in order to create stone sculptures and gravestones. Several copper alloy ore mines were to be found around the Purépecha state in what is now the Mexican state of Michoacan, such mines were also used by the Spanish during the New Spain rule. Bronze axes were also weapons of the Inca empire and other civilizations of South America that were also used as weapons to dominate local kingdoms or to defend from foreign invasions.

Popular culture

The bronze axe is mentioned in the Relación de Michoacán, in the story of the Purepecha's Princess Erendira, who resisted the Spanish invasion. In one part of the story, it is described how the local women started to dress the princess and gave her axes to cut firewood, in preparation for her wedding.

Also from the Relación de Michoacán, it is stated that a man who remarried was required to spend four days gathering wood beforehand as a kind of penance.

See also
 Aztec warfare
 Purépecha culture
 Traditional metal working in Mexico

References

Axes
Aztec warfare